Peuker, Peucker is the German surname of

 Caspar Peucer (or Peucker) (1525, Bautzen – 1602), reformer, mathematician, astronomer, medic, diplomat and writer
 Nicolaus (Nikolaus) Peucker (Peuker) (1620, Kolbnitz bei Jauer, Silesia – 1674), German poet
 Eduard von Peucker (1791, Schmiedeberg im Riesengebirge – 1876), Prussian General of Infantry

See also 
 Peukert
 Peuckert

German-language surnames